Haifa is a 1996 Palestinian drama film directed by Rashid Masharawi. It was screened in the Un Certain Regard section at the 1996 Cannes Film Festival.

Cast
 Mohammed Bakri - Haifa
 Ahmad Abu Sal'oum - Abu Said
 Hiam Abbass - Oum Said (as Hiyam Abbass)
 Nawal Zaqout - Sabah
 Fadi El-Ghoul - Siad
 Areen Omari - Samira
 Khaled Awad - Abbas (as Khalid Awad)
 George Ibrahim (actor) - Postman
 Mariam El-Hin - Haifa's aunt
 Mahmoud Qadah - Said
 Hussam Abu Eisheh - Barber
 Samer Abu Eisheh - Son of the barber
 Younis Younis - Younis

References

External links

1996 films
Palestinian drama films
1990s Arabic-language films
1996 drama films
Films directed by Rashid Masharawi